Beanie may refer to:

Headgear
 Beanie (seamed cap), in parts of North America, a cap made from cloth often joined by a button at the crown and seamed together around the sides
 Beanie, a knit cap, in Britain, Australia, South Africa and parts of Canada and the United States (also known as a toque)
 Beanie, any type of headgear unsuitable for safe motorcycling

People
 Richard Dalley, American ice dancer
 Beanie Ebert (1902–1980), American football player
 Beanie Feldstein (b. 1993), American actress and singer
 Beanie Sigel (b. 1974), American rapper born Dwight Grant
 H. M. Walker (1878–1937), American writer for silent and early talking films and newspaper sports writer 
 Beanie Wells (b. 1988), American football running back
 Les Witte (1911–1973), American basketball             
 Wilbur Soot (b. 1996), English Twitch streamer and YouTuber

Arts, entertainment, and media
The Beanies, an Australian children's band and podcast
Beanie Babies, a popular stuffed toy animal line, launched in 1993
Ben "Beanie" Harper, a character on the soap opera Love of Life
Beany, title character of the children's programs Time for Beany, Beany and Cecil, and The New Adventures of Beany and Cecil

See also
Beeny, a hamlet in England